Meshkan is a city in Fars Province, Iran.

Meshkan or Moshkan may also refer to:

Moshkan, Khorrambid, Fars Province
Moshkan, Isfahan
Meshkan, Baft, Kerman Province
Moshkan, Markazi
Meshkan, Razavi Khorasan
Meshkan District, in Razavi Khorasan Province
Meshkan Rural District (disambiguation)